Clean eating is a fad diet based on the belief that consuming whole foods and avoiding convenience food and other processed foods offers certain health benefits. Variations of the diet may also exclude gluten, grains, and/or dairy products and advocate the consumption of raw food. The diet has been criticized for lacking scientific evidence and potentially posing health risks. Clean eating is not supported by nutritionists, as it may lead to malnutrition and the formation of unhealthy eating practices.

Definition
Clean eating is the belief that consuming whole foods and avoiding convenience food and other processed foods offers certain health benefits. Variations of the diet may also exclude gluten, grains, and/or dairy products and advocate the consumption of raw food.

Proponents 
While there is limited research on the health effects of clean eating, clean eating trends have become increasingly popular through the use of various media outlets including blogs, television segments, and magazine articles. Many of these media are supported and headed by various health and wellness gurus who typically base the information they provide on personal experience. Advocates include Ella Mills, Natasha Corrett, and the Hemsley sisters.

Criticism 
The idea of clean eating has been criticized as lacking scientific evidence for its claims, and cutting entire food groups out of the diet to pose health risks in extreme cases. It has also been claimed that processed foods have been modified to prevent diseases and therefore have some health benefits (in the form of food safety) over a clean eating diet. It has also been claimed that a clean eating diet may increase the risk of osteoporosis due to a lack of calcium from dairy products. Health risks associated with this diet include food poisoning and diseases from parasites.

See also 
 Health food
 List of diets
 Paleolithic diet

References

External links

 
Fad diets